WNIX (1330 AM) is a radio station broadcasting a News-Talk format, featuring Dana Loesch, Todd Starnes, Brian Kilmeade, and Bill O'Reilly. Licensed to Greenville, Mississippi, United States, the station is currently owned by Delta Radio Network LLC.  It is the oldest radio station in Greenville, MS, and the second oldest radio station in the Mississippi Delta.

In 2017, WNIX was granted approval to increase day power from 1,000 to 3,800 watts and decrease night power from 500 to 55 watts, making the station the most powerful AM facility in the Mississippi Delta.  Both daytime and nighttime patterns are (1 tower) non-directional.

WNIX also broadcasts on FM translator W266BY, Greenville, MS.

References

External links

NIX
Radio stations established in 1937